L.A. Hair was an American reality television series on WE tv. The series debuted on May 31, 2012 and was originally titled Hair Divas: Hollywood. The series follows celebrity stylist Kim Kimble and her staff  at her salon, Kimble Hair Studio. WE tv announced in October 2012 that the series had been renewed for a ten episode second season, which debuted on June 6, 2013. WE tv has ordered a 12-episode third season that premiered on May 22, 2014. On March 3, 2015 WE tv renewed the show for a fourth season that premiered in July 2015. The fifth season of L.A. Hair premiered on January 5, 2017.

Cast

Timeline of cast members

Supporting Cast
  Charity Cabico  (Season 1)
  Jose Monterroza  (Season 2)
  Malaka Upshaw  (Season 3)
  Dia  (Season 3–present)

Episodes

Series overview

Season 1 (2012)

Season 2 (2013)

Season 3 (2014)

Season 4 (2015)

Season 5 (2017)

References

External links
 
 

2010s American reality television series
2012 American television series debuts
English-language television shows
2017 American television series endings